The Charles University Rector election, 2017 was held on 20 October 2017. The incumbent Rector Tomáš Zima defeated Jan Černý and was elected for his second term.

Candidates
Jan Černý, Biologist at Faculty of Natural Sciences.
Tomáš Zima, the incumbent Rector.

Voting

68 members of academic senate voted. Zima received 51 votes to Černý's 17 votes and thus was reelected.

Czech President Miloš Zeman confirmed the election on 21 January 2018 and reappointed Zima the Rector. He will remain in the position until 2022 when is second term expires. He won't be eligible to run for another term.

Notes

2013
Charles University Rector election
Charles University Rector election
Non-partisan elections